is a subway station in Chiyoda, Tokyo, Japan, jointly operated by Tokyo Metro and Toei Subway.

Lines
Kudanshita Station is served by the following three subway lines.
 Toei Shinjuku Line (S-05)
 Tokyo Metro Hanzōmon Line (Z-06)
 Tokyo Metro Tozai Line (T-07)

Station layout
The underground station is built on three main levels, with the Tōzai Line platforms located on the 2nd basement level and the Shinjuku Line and Hanzōmon Line platforms on the 4th basement level.

Platforms
The Tōzai Line platforms consist of two side platforms running approximately north-south. The Shinjuku Line and Hanzōmon Line platforms on the 4th basement level were originally configured as two sets of side platforms running approximately east-west parallel to each other. From 16 March 2013, the separating wall between these platforms was removed, allowing cross-platform interchange between platform 4 (Hanzōmon Line Oshiage-bound) and platform 5 (Shinjuku Line Shinjuku-bound).

The song "Under the Big Onion" (大きな玉ねぎの下で, Ookina Tamanegi no Shita de) by the band Bakufū Slump is used as the departure melody for the Tōzai Line platforms in 2015.

History
The station opened on 23 December 1964 as the eastern terminus of the Tozai Line from Takadanobaba.
The Shinjuku Line platforms opened on 16 March 1980, and the Hanzomon Line platforms on 26 January 1989.

The station facilities of the Hanzomon and Tozai Lines were inherited by Tokyo Metro after the privatization of the Teito Rapid Transit Authority (TRTA) in 2004.

Work commenced on removing the separating wall between the parallel Tokyo Metro Hanzomon Line and Toei Shinjuku Line platforms (4 and 5) in 2012, allowing cross-platform interchange from 16 March 2013.

Surrounding area
This is the closest subway station to Yasukuni Shrine and Nippon Budokan.

See also
 List of railway stations in Japan

References

External links

 Kudanshita Station information (Tokyo Metro) 
 Kudanshita Station information (Toei Subway) 

Railway stations in Tokyo
Stations of Tokyo Metro
Tokyo Metro Tozai Line
Tokyo Metro Hanzomon Line
Railway stations in Japan opened in 1964